Daniel Alexander Jaramillo Diez (born 15 January 1991) is a Colombian racing cyclist, who currently rides for Colombian amateur team .

Major results

2010
 7th Overall Vuelta a Guatemala
2011
 Pan American Road Championships
2nd  Under-23 time trial
6th Time trial
2012
 3rd Overall Vuelta a Mexico
1st Young rider classification
2013
 3rd Road race, National Under-23 Road Championships
2014
 5th Overall Tour of the Gila
1st Mountains classification
1st Young rider classification
1st Stages 1 & 5
 5th Philadelphia International Cycling Classic
 9th Bucks County Classic
2015
 2nd Road race, National Road Championships
 2nd Overall Tour of the Gila
1st  Young rider classification
 5th Philadelphia International Championship
 8th Overall Tour de San Luis
2016
 1st Stage 5 Tour of Japan
 2nd Overall Tour de Langkawi
 5th Overall Tour of the Gila
1st Mountains classification
1st Stage 5
2017
 1st  Overall Tour de Hongrie
1st Stage 4
 1st  Mountains classification Tour of California
 4th Overall Tour de Langkawi
2018
 5th Overall Joe Martin Stage Race

References

External links

1991 births
Living people
Colombian male cyclists
Cyclists at the 2015 Pan American Games
Pan American Games competitors for Colombia
Sportspeople from Antioquia Department
20th-century Colombian people
21st-century Colombian people